Avignon Volley-Ball is a French professional Volleyball team based in Avignon, Vaucluse. It is playing in the Ligue B for the 2013/2014 season.

History
Initially, the Volley-ball team was a part of the Rugby league team of Avignon (SOA XIII), but in 1961 the club became independent.
In 1996, "AVB" achieved its highest ranking in French volleyball league, finishing at the fourth place and qualifying for the CEV European cup.
In 1997, the team also qualified for the CEV cup, due to their participation in the French volley-ball cup final but lost against Paris Université Club 1-3.
They were eliminated on the first round by the Avtomobilist St Petersburg.
In the 2011/2012 season, they won their third "second division" title and were promoted to French volleyball league.

Achievements

Coupe de France
 Runners-up : 1997
Pro B (second division) (3)
 Champion : 1999, 2000, 2012,

Squad 2013/2014

Previous players
Loïc De Kergret 
Romain Vadeleux 
Frédéric Havas 
Matti Hietanen 
Mark McGivern 
Eemi Tervaportti 
Nathan French 
Mariusz Sordyl 
Delano Thomas 
Mariusz Szyszko 
Vladimir Samsonov 
Ruslans Sorokins 
Élysée Ossosso

External links
 Official site

French volleyball clubs
Volleyball in France